Camden Council may refer to:

Camden London Borough Council
Camden Council (New South Wales)
Camden Council, Boy Scouts of America